A snow day is a winter weather-related cancellation, due to excessive amounts of snow, ice, and/or other causes, such as at a school or place of employment.

Snow day may also refer to:
Snow day (meteorology), a day when snow falls
Snow Day (film), a 2000 comedy film
Snow Day (2022 film), a musical remake of the 2000 film of the same name
"Snow Day" (Amphibia), an episode of Amphibia
"Snow Day", an episode of CSI: NY
"Snow Day", an episode of Rise of the Teenage Mutant Ninja Turtles
"Snow Day", an episode of Zoboomafoo